Gephyromantis moseri, commonly known as Moser's Madagascar frog, is a species of frog in the family Mantellidae.  It is endemic to Madagascar.  Its natural habitats are subtropical or tropical moist lowland forests and rivers.  It is threatened by habitat loss.

References

moseri
Endemic fauna of Madagascar
Taxonomy articles created by Polbot
Amphibians described in 2002